Clapham Junction is an urban locality around Clapham Junction railway station in London, England. Despite its name, it is not located in Clapham, but forms the commercial centre of Battersea.

Clapham Junction was a scene of disturbances during the 2011 London riots.

Transport links
Clapham Junction railway station is served by London Overground, Southern and South Western Railway services to Central London, Surrey, Sussex, Hampshire and Dorset.

London Buses routes 35, 37, 39, 49, 77, 87, 156, 170, 219, 295, 319, 337, 344, 345, C3 and G1.

References

Battersea
Districts of the London Borough of Wandsworth